The Bushwackers Band, often simply the Bushwackers, is an Australian folk and country music band or Bush band founded at La Trobe University in Melbourne in 1971.

Band history
Originally calling themselves The Original Bushwhackers and Bullockies Bush Band (spelling later changed to "Bushwackers"), the three founding members were guitarist Dave Isom, tea-chest bass player Jan 'Yarn' Wositzky and lagerphonist Bert Kahanoff. The band was conceived at La Trobe University in Melbourne when the founding members, in order to qualify for a grant to travel to the Aquarius Arts Festival 1972 at the ANU in Canberra, had to register as a formal act, consequently taking their name from the title of an album by the English folk singer Martyn Wyndham-Read. They were later joined by various players, including accordion and concertina player Mick Slocum, and fiddlers Tony Hunt and Dave Kidd, and in 1974 the band went full-time with their first tour to the British Isles, and Kahanoff was replaced by lagerphone player Dobe Newton. With an ever-changing line-up, and adding tin whistle, harmonica, concertina, 5-string banjo, bodhrán, bones, spoons, electric bass and guitar and drums the band worked throughout Australia and Europe.

Roger Corbett joined the band in 1980 and remains the principal songwriter, producer and manager of the band. Other members have included Fred Kuhnl, David Brannigan (The Colinails), drummer Gregory Martin, Steve Groves, Pete Farndon, Dave Mattacks, Pat Drummond, Michael Harris, Louis McManus, Eddy van Roosendael, Freddie Strauks (ex Skyhooks), drummer Pete Drummond (currently with Dragon) and world-renowned Australian guitarist Tommy Emmanuel.

Discography

Studio albums

Live albums

Compilation albums

Extended plays

Singles

Awards and nominations

Country Music Awards of Australia
The Country Music Awards of Australia (also known as the Golden Guitar Awards and originally named Australasian Country Music Awards) is an annual awards night held in January during the Tamworth Country Music Festival, in Tamworth, New South Wales, celebrating recording excellence in the Australian country music industry. The Bushwackers have won three awards (wins only).

|-
| 1981
| "Flying Pieman"
| Instrumental of the Year
| 
|-
| 2010
| "The Road to Thargomindah" (written by Colin Buchanan)
| Bush Ballad of the Year
| 
|-
| 2012
| "I Am Australian" 
| Heritage Track of the Year
| 
|-
| 2022
| The Bushwackers
| Australian Roll of Renown
| 
|-

Mo Awards
The Australian Entertainment Mo Awards (commonly known informally as the Mo Awards), were annual Australian entertainment industry awards. They recognise achievements in live entertainment in Australia from 1975 to 2016. The Bushwackers have won three awards (wins only).

|-
| 1983
| Themselves
| Best Country Group
| 
|-
| 1986
| Themselves
| Best Country Group
| 
|-
| 1988
| Themselves
| Best Country Group
| 
|-

References

External links 
Official site

Australian folk music groups
La Trobe University alumni
Musical groups from Melbourne
Musical groups established in 1971
Australian country music groups